The 1958 Minnesota gubernatorial election took place on November 4, 1958. Minnesota Democratic–Farmer–Labor Party candidate Orville Freeman defeated Republican Party of Minnesota challenger George MacKinnon.

Results

See also
 List of Minnesota gubernatorial elections

External links
 http://www.sos.state.mn.us/home/index.asp?page=653
 http://www.sos.state.mn.us/home/index.asp?page=657

Minnesota
Gubernatorial
1958
November 1958 events in the United States